The Lieutenant Nun (Spanish: La monja alférez) is a 1944 Mexican historical adventure film directed by  Emilio Gómez Muriel and starring María Félix, Ángel Garasa and José Cibrián. It is based on the life of Catalina de Erauso.

The film's sets were designed by the art director Jorge Fernández.

Cast
  María Félix as Catalina Erauso 'La Monja Alférez' / Don Alonso 
 Ángel Garasa as Roger 
 José Cibrián as Juan de Aguirre 
 Delia Magaña as Elvira 
 José Pidal as Don César, canónigo 
 Fanny Schiller as Doña Úrsula 
 Paco Fuentes as Don Miguel de Erauso 
 Eugenia Galindo as Doña Cristina 
 Esther Luquín as Beatriz 
 Maruja Grifell as Reverenda madre 
 José Goula as Don Claudio 
 Lauro Benítez as Don Indalecio 
 Jesús Valero as Sacerdote 
 Manuel Sánchez Navarro as Don Diego Fernández de Córdova, Virrey del Peru 
 Enrique García Álvarez as Don Ignacio de Aguirre
 Consuelo Guerrero de Luna as Lucinda

References

Bibliography 
 Klossner, Michael. The Europe of 1500-1815 on Film and Television: A Worldwide Filmography of Over 2550 Works, 1895 Through 2000. McFarland & Company, 2002.

External links 
 

1944 films
1940s historical adventure films
Mexican historical adventure films
1940s Spanish-language films
Films directed by Emilio Gómez Muriel
Films set in the 17th century
Mexican black-and-white films
1940s Mexican films
Cultural depictions of Spanish women